Cephalocassis melanochir is a species of catfish in the family Ariidae. It was described by Pieter Bleeker in 1852, originally under the genus Arius. It inhabits freshwater lakes and rivers in Malaysia and Indonesia. It feeds on finfish and benthic crustaceans.

References

Ariidae
Fish described in 1852